Mszana  (German: Mschanna) is a village in Wodzisław County, Silesian Voivodeship, in southern Poland. It is the seat of the gmina (administrative district) called Gmina Mszana.

The village has a population of 3,559.

The village was first mentioned in a Latin document of Diocese of Wrocław called Liber fundationis episcopatus Vratislaviensis from around 1305 as item in Msana debent esse triginta mansi.

Notable people
 August Sternickel - criminal and serial killer

References

External links 
 Jewish Community in Mszana on Virtual Shtetl

Mszana